The Andean swallow (Orochelidon andecola) is a species of bird in the family Hirundinidae. It was formerly placed in the monotypic genus Haplochelidon.
It is found in the Altiplano of Peru, Bolivia and far northern Chile and Argentina. Its natural habitats are subtropical or tropical high-elevation shrubland and subtropical or tropical high-elevation grassland.

References

Further reading

Andean swallow
Birds of the Andes
Birds of the Puna grassland
Andean swallow
Taxonomy articles created by Polbot